Dennis Herron Murphree (January 6, 1886February 9, 1949) was an American politician. He served three separate terms as Lieutenant Governor of Mississippi and two as Governor of Mississippi.

Biography
He was born on January 6, 1886, the son of Thomas F. Murphree and Callie (Cooper) Murphree. He was a member of the Mississippi House of Representatives from 1911 to 1923. In March 1927, he became Governor of Mississippi after the death of incumbent Henry L. Whitfield. He served for about ten months until Theodore G. Bilbo, who defeated Murphree in the Democratic Party primary by 10,000 votes, was sworn into office in January 1928. Defeat has been attributed in part to his having prevented a lynching in Jackson (he mobilized the National Guard and threw up a barbed-wire barricade around the jail). With the death of Gov. Paul B. Johnson Sr. in December 1943, Murphree finished out the three weeks left in Johnson's term, serving until the swearing-in of Thomas L. Bailey in January 1944.

Dennis Murphree conceived the idea of the Know Mississippi Better train in 1925 in response to Governor Whitfield's wish to create an exposition of Mississippi for the rest of the country. The train was successful and continued to tour annually until at least 1937. The train visited forty-seven other states, Canada, and Mexico, and showcased the state's industry, entertainment, and commerce sectors.

References

External links 
 Dennis Murphree's grave at Find-A-Grave
 Profile at National Governors Association website
 The Story of the "Know Mississippi Better" Train

1886 births
1949 deaths
People from Calhoun County, Mississippi
Democratic Party governors of Mississippi
Lieutenant Governors of Mississippi
Democratic Party members of the Mississippi House of Representatives
American male journalists
Journalists from Mississippi
20th-century American politicians